FJR may refer to:
 Father John Redmond Catholic Secondary School and Regional Arts Centre, in Toronto, Ontario, Canada
 Formula Junior, a racing class
 Frederick James Rowe (c.1844 – 5 January 1909), a professor of English literature
 Frente Juvenil Revolucionario, the youth wing of the Mexican Institutional Revolutionary Party
 Fujairah International Airport, in the United Arab Emirates

See also 
 FJ (disambiguation)